Veracruz is a corregimiento in Arraiján District, Panamá Oeste Province, Panama with a population of 18,589 as of 2010. Its population as of 1990 was 8,224; its population as of 2000 was 16,748.

Education
Lycée Français Paul Gauguin de Panama, the country's French international school, is in Panama Pacifico, Veracruz.

References

Corregimientos of Panamá Oeste Province